Laussonne is a commune in the Haute-Loire department in south-central France.

Population

Personalities
Reine Antier (1801–83), founder of the Congrégation des Soeurs de l'Enfant-Jésus de Chauffailles, an order of teaching nuns.

See also
Communes of the Haute-Loire department

References

Communes of Haute-Loire